Jones Creek is a stream in Jasper and Newton counties in the U.S. state of Missouri. It is a tributary of Center Creek.

The stream flows to the northwest passing the communities of Pepsin and Parshley. It passes under I-44 and gains the tributary of Jenkins Creek.

Jones Creek has the name of the local Jones family.

See also
List of rivers of Missouri

References

Rivers of Jasper County, Missouri
Rivers of Newton County, Missouri
Rivers of Missouri